That's Life is the ninth studio album by American country music artist Neal McCoy. It was released on August 23, 2005 on his own 903 Music label. Three singles were released from this album: "Billy's Got His Beer Goggles On", the first of these three, reached #10 on the Hot Country Songs charts in 2005, becoming McCoy's first Top Ten hit since "The Shake" in 1997. "The Last of a Dying Breed" peaked at #35, while "Tail on the Tailgate" failed to chart. Also included here is a live rendition of "Hillbilly Rap", the original version of which was an album cut from his 1996 self-titled album.

Track listing
"Got Mud" (Monty Criswell, Jerrod Niemann) – 2:51
"Intro (General Tommy Franks)" – 0:45
spoken-word intro to "The Last of a Dying Breed", recited by Tommy Franks
"The Last of a Dying Breed" (Tommy Connors, Don Rollins, D. Vincent Williams) – 3:02
"That's Life" (Eric Silver, Matt Rollings) – 4:10
"Billy's Got His Beer Goggles On" (Philip White, Michael Mobley) – 3:38
"That's a Picture" (Bryan Simpson, Wade Kirby, Ashley Gorley) – 3:04
"You Let Me Be the Hero" (Silver, Rodney Clawson) – 3:46
"Tail on the Tailgate" (Brian Gene White, Tania Hancheroff, Clawson) – 4:00
"Tails I Lose" (Silver, Neal McCoy) – 3:46
"Jessie" (Jeremy Campbell, McCoy, Donny Hackett) – 3:52
"You're My Jamaica" (Kent Robbins) – 3:45
featuring Charley Pride
"Head South" (Darrell Scott) – 2:40
"Hillbilly Rap (Live)" (Lord Burgess, Bernard Edwards, Nile Rodgers, William Attawar, Paul Henning) – 6:31

A special CD-ROM track of "Billy's Got His Beer Goggles On" is also available on some presses of the album.

Personnel
David Angell - violin
Steve Auburn - fiddle, background vocals
Bekka Bramlett - background vocals
Bob Britt - electric guitar
Matt Britton - steel drums
Chuck Butler - drum programming
David Davidson - violin
Scott Dixon - electric guitar
Tommy Franks - introduction on track 2
Sonny Garrish - steel guitar, lap steel guitar
Wes Hightower - background vocals
Mark Hill - bass guitar
Wayne Killius - drums, percussion
Anthony LaMarchina - cello
Troy Lancaster - electric guitar
Brent Mason - electric guitar
Lynn Massey - drums, background vocals
Neal McCoy - lead vocals
Shane McDaniel - steel guitar, background vocals
Jerry McPherson - electric guitar
Lorne O'Neil - bass guitar, background vocals
Charley Pride - vocals on "You're My Jamaica"
Michael Rhodes - bass guitar
Jeffrey Roach - Hammond organ, synthesizer
Tom Roady - percussion 
Lou Rodriguez - acoustic guitar, background vocals
Mike Rojas - Hammond organ, piano, synthesizer
Matt Rollings - piano
Eric Silver - banjo, fiddle, acoustic guitar, baritone guitar, electric guitar, mandolin, shaker, background vocals, wah wah guitar
Pamela Sixfin - violin
Todd Stewart - keyboards
Bryan White - background vocals
Kristen Wilkinson - string arrangements, viola
Andrea Zonn - background vocals

Chart performance

References

2005 albums
Neal McCoy albums